Krasny Kut (lit. beautiful place) is a town and the administrative center of Krasnokutsky District in Saratov Oblast, Russia, located on the right bank of the Yeruslan River (Volga's tributary),  southeast of Saratov, the administrative center of the oblast. Population:

History
It was founded in 1837 by Ukrainian migrants and was granted town status in 1966.

Cosmonaut Gherman Titov landed near Krasny Kut at the end of his Vostok 2 mission on August 7, 1961.

Administrative and municipal status
Within the framework of administrative divisions, Krasny Kut serves as the administrative center of Krasnokutsky District, to which it is directly subordinated. As a municipal division, the town of Krasny Kut, together with two rural localities, is incorporated within Krasnokutsky Municipal District as Krasny Kut Urban Settlement.

References

Notes

Sources

Cities and towns in Saratov Oblast